Rampura Thana is an administrative unit of Dhaka.It is situated near bonosree. This is a very densely populated area. Markets, super shops, stores and pharmacies are near by within 200 meters of radius. Essential transportation as well as hospitals are also easily assessable.

History
In 1975, the headquarters of Bangladesh Television have been constructed in Rampura, and the network officially moved its offices and studios from the DIT Bhaban that year. It is the site of GSK Dhaka Half Marathon, sponsored by GSK pharmaceuticals and is a popular marathon in Bangladesh. Rampura KC is the local football club of Rampura and it plays in the Dhaka City Corporation Pioneer Football League. The club qualified for Third Division Football League after a good performance in the Pioneer League in 2008.

Geography
Rampura Thana has an area of 2.80 km2. It has two wards or unions, they are ward number 22 and 23. It has 17 Mahalla and Mouza. It is bordering Gulshan Thana and Badda Thana in the north and in the south it borders Khilgaon Thana and Motijheel Thana. Khilgaon Thana is also east of Rampura Thana and in the west it borders Ramna Thana and Tejgaon. Rampura canal is a canal in Rampura and the only drainage system in Eastern Dhaka that take out rain water and industrial waste out of the area. It has had problems with encroachment and land grabs. In the rainy season it is used to transport vegetables and fruits into Dhaka. Rampura has a number of housing projects including Aftabnagar housing project and Banasree Housing Project. The authorities of Aftabnagar housing project and Eastern Housing Ltd have been accused in a report by The Daily Star of filling Rampura Canal to increase their lands.

Demography
As on 2 August 2009 Rampura Thana has a population of 138,923 and a population density of 49,615 per square kilometer. It has a literacy rate 74.45 percent with male literacy at 76.52 percent and female literacy rate at 72.38 percent. It has 47,451 males in ward 22 and 29934 males in ward 23. It has 38,912 females in ward 22 and 22,626 females in ward 23. There is also a number of garment factories in the Thana, that have been sights of labour unrest. Rampura Thana is a low crime neighborhood of Dhaka City.

Administration
Rampura Thana is provided security by Rampura Thana police station. Rampura pump station is responsible for providing water to the Thana. The pump draws water from Balu river, Debdholai river, and Narai river. Increasing water pollution have led to calls for adding a water treatment plant to the pump. The pump is managed by Dhaka WASA (Water Supply & Sewerage Authority) of Water Supply and Sewerage Authority. WASA has faced criticism for supplying polluted water to the Thana.

Education

Colleges
 Taltala City College
 City Dental College
 Rampura Ekramunnesa High School and College
Rajdhani Ideal School & College
Ideal School & College
 National Ideal School & College.
 Oxford International School.
 Basic Ideal School &  College.

Secondary schools
 Malibagh Chowdhury Para Govt
 Shahid Faruq Iqbal Girls High School
 Proshika School 
 Chowdhury Para Madrasa
Purbo Rampura High School

References

Thanas of Dhaka
Dhaka District